Manganese bronze may refer to:

 Manganese bronze, one of many possible alloys called bronze
 Manganese Bronze Holdings, a British engineering company